The Comedy Channel was a short-lived satellite television network owned by British Sky Broadcasting during the early 1990s.

History
The channel launched on 1 October 1991, soon after the merger of Sky Television plc and British Satellite Broadcasting. The merged company called British Sky Broadcasting, brought together comedy programming from its existing libraries – Sky having an archive of American imports (including Three's Company, I Love Lucy, Green Acres, The Beverly Hillbillies and Seinfeld) and BSB having obtained rights to a number of BBC sitcoms such as 'Allo 'Allo!, Steptoe and Son, Are You Being Served?, Porridge, Dad's Army and The Goodies.

The Comedy Channel existed in the days before the basic Sky Multichannels subscription package, so was made available as a premium service to subscribers of either Sky Movies or The Movie Channel. Listings for the channel were carried in Radio Times and other listings magazines.

The network lost its broadcasting rights following the expiry of the contract between the BBC and former BSB. Eventually the channel closed on 30 September 1992 to be replaced by Sky Movies Gold, a service dedicated to "classic movies". Following the end of the contract with Sky, the BBC's archive programming was subsequently used to launch UK Gold on satellite and cable from 1 November 1992.

Sky would not relaunch a comedy-based channel until the arrival of Sky Comedy on 27 January 2020, it retains a minority interest in the domestic version of ViacomCBS's Comedy Central.

Programming

American

 The Abbott and Costello Show
 The Addams Family
 Ann Jillian
 Babes
 Barney Miller
 The Beverly Hillbillies
 The Bob Newhart Show
 Car 54, Where Are You?
 Comic Strip Live
 Doctor Doctor
 F Troop
 Free Spirit
 Gilligan's Island
 Green Acres
 Here's Lucy
 Hogan's Heroes
 Homeroom
 The Honeymooners
 I Love Lucy
 In Living Color
 It's Garry Shandling's Show
 Leave It to Beaver
 The Love Boat
 The Lucy Show
 The Lucy-Desi Comedy Hour
 The Mary Tyler Moore Show
 McHale's Navy
 Mister Ed
 The Monkees
 Moonlighting
 The Munsters
 Night Court
 Petticoat Junction
 Rowan & Martin's Laugh-In
 Seinfeld
 The Sonny & Cher Comedy Hour
 The Sunday Comics
 Three's Company
 Wings
 Working It Out

Australian
 The Comedy Company
 Mother and Son

British

 'Allo 'Allo!
 Are You Being Served?
 Dad's Army
 The Good Life
 The Goodies
 Oh, Brother!
 Porridge
 Steptoe and Son
 Till Death Us Do Part
 The Young Ones

Canadian
 The Kids in the Hall
 Maniac Mansion

References

Defunct television channels in the United Kingdom
Sky television channels
Comedy television networks
1991 establishments in the United Kingdom
Television channels and stations established in 1991
Television channels and stations disestablished in 1992
1990s in the United Kingdom
1990s in British television
History of television in the United Kingdom